Annett Neumann (born 31 January 1970) is a German track cyclist who competed at the 1992 Summer Olympics in Barcelona, winning the silver medal in the sprint event.

References

External links
 
 
 

1970 births
Living people
People from Lauchhammer
People from Bezirk Cottbus
German female cyclists
Cyclists from Brandenburg
Cyclists at the 1992 Summer Olympics
Cyclists at the 1996 Summer Olympics
Olympic silver medalists for Germany
Olympic cyclists of Germany
Olympic medalists in cycling
Medalists at the 1992 Summer Olympics
Recipients of the Silver Laurel Leaf
20th-century German women